Oksana Kliachina (born 11 September 1997) is a Ukrainian road and track cyclist, who currently rides for UCI Women's Team , and represents Ukraine at international competitions. She competed at the 2015 UEC European Track Championships in the team pursuit event and at the 2016 UEC European Track Championships in the team pursuit event.

References

External links

1997 births
Living people
Ukrainian female cyclists
Ukrainian track cyclists
Place of birth missing (living people)
Cyclists at the 2019 European Games
European Games competitors for Ukraine
21st-century Ukrainian women